Eleutherocercus was a genus of glyptodonts that lived during the Late Miocene and Early Pliocene in South America. Fossils of the genus have been found in the Huayquerian Ituzaingó Formation (E. paranensis) and the Montehermosan Monte Hermoso Formation (E. antiquus) in Argentina.

References

Further reading 
 A. L. Cione, M. M. Azpelicueta, M. Bond, A. A. Carlini, J. R. Casciotta, M. A. Cozzuol, M. Fuente, Z. Gasparini, F. J. Goin, J. Noriega, G. J. Scillato-Yane, L. Soibelzon, E. P. Tonni, D. Verzi, and M. G. Vucetich. 2000. Miocene vertebrates from Entre Rios province, eastern Argentina. Serie Correlacion Geologica 14:191-237
 R. L. Tomassini, C. I. Montalvo, C.M. Deschamps and T. Manera. 2013. Biostratigraphy and biochronology of the Monte Hermoso Formation (early Pliocene) at its type locality, Buenos Aires Province, Argentina. Journal of South American Earth Sciences 48:31-42
 R. L. Tomassini and C. I. Montalvo. 2013. Taphonomic modes on fluvial deposits of the Monte Hermoso Formation (early Pliocene), Buenos Aires province, Argentina. Palaeogeography, Palaeoclimatology, Palaeoecology 369:282-294

Prehistoric cingulates
Miocene xenarthrans
Pliocene xenarthrans
Prehistoric placental genera
Miocene mammals of South America
Pliocene mammals of South America
Huayquerian
Montehermosan
Neogene Argentina
Fossils of Argentina
Ituzaingó Formation
Fossil taxa described in 1888